The River is a 1933 Czechoslovak film drama directed by Josef Rovenský. The film was also released with German voiceovers under the title Junge Liebe in 1934.

The film won Best Director Prize at 1934 Venice Film Festival.

Production
The film was shot in 12 days — 3 days for exteriors and 9 days in the studio. The outdoor scenes were filmed around Poříčí nad Sázavou and in hotel Hubertus in Jíloviště.

Cast
Jarmila Beránková as Pepička Matuková
Václav Jalovec as Pavel Sychra
Jaroslav Vojta as Jan Sychra, Pavel's father
Hermína Vojtová as Pavel's mother
Jan Sviták as Poacher Václav Zimák
Rudolf Deyl sr. as Teacher
Jan W. Speerger as Gendarme
Antonín Marlé as Buyer
Marie Rýdlová as Buyer's wife
Jaroslav Marvan as Director of the hotel
Josef Rovenský as Poacher

Release
The premiere was in Lucerna cinema in Prague on 13 October 1933. The film was commercially very successful. It won a Best Director Prize at 1934 Venice Film Festival and was distributed in 30 countries. It was the first Czechoslovak film distributed in Japan and India.

References

External links
 

1933 films
Czechoslovak black-and-white films
Czech romantic drama films
Czechoslovak drama films
Films directed by Josef Rovenský
1933 romantic drama films
1930s Czech films